Fissurella fascicularis, common name the wobbly keyhole limpet, is a species of sea snail, a marine gastropod mollusk in the family Fissurellidae, the keyhole limpets.

Description
The size of the shell varies between 14 mm and 32 mm.

Distribution
This marine species occurs in the Gulf of Mexico, the Caribbean Sea and off the Lesser Antilles.

References

  Rosenberg, G.; Moretzsohn, F.; García, E. F. (2009). Gastropoda (Mollusca) of the Gulf of Mexico, Pp. 579–699 in: Felder, D.L. and D.K. Camp (eds.), Gulf of Mexico–Origins, Waters, and Biota. Texas A&M Press, College Station, Texas.

External links
 

Fissurellidae
Gastropods described in 1822